The Ruzang or Confucian Canon is an ongoing project to compile all known classical works on Confucianism, Thirteen Classics and others comparable to the Daozang (Taoist Canon) and the Chinese Buddhist Canon. It also includes Japanese, Korean and Vietnamese Confucian classics.

The project, which involves 400 scholars, was led by the prominent Peking University philosopher Tang Yijie until his death in 2014. Due to be finished in 2025, the Canon is estimated to comprise more than 5,000 works with approximately a billion Chinese characters.

See also
 Chinese classics

Notes

External links 
儒藏网——四川大学古籍整理研究所 (Ruzang Net—Sichuan University Institute of Ancient Books)
北京大学儒藏编纂中心 (Beijing University Ruzang Compilation Center)

Confucian texts
Chinese classic texts